Stuart MacGregor may refer to:
 Stuart MacGregor (writer)
 Stuart MacGregor (squash player)

See also
 Stuart McGregor, Canadian Paralympic athlete